This is a comprehensive list of victories of the  cycling team. The races are categorized according to the UCI Continental Circuits rules.

2008 Team MTN 

 Overall Tour d'Egypte, Jay Robert Thomson
Stage 1 & 2, Jay Robert Thomson
Stage 5 Giro del Capo, David George
 South Africa, Road Race Championships, Ian McLeod
Stage 3, 5 & 8 Tour du Maroc, Malcolm Lange
Stage 9 Tour du Maroc, Nicholas White
Amashovashova Classic, Malcolm Lange

2010 MTN–Energade 

 Road Race Championships, Christoff Van Heerden
 Time Trial Championships, Kevin Evans
 Road Race Championships, Adrien Niyonshuti

2011 MTN–Qhubeka 

 Time Trial Championships, Daryl Impey
Stage 2 Tour du Maroc, Reinardt Janse van Rensburg
Stages 3 & 9 Tour du Maroc, Arran Brown
Stage 7 Tour du Maroc, Daryl Impey
 Road Race Championships, Lotto Petrus
 Time Trial Championships, Lotto Petrus
 Road Race Championships, Adrien Niyonshuti
Stage 2 Herald Sun Tour, Reinardt Janse van Rensburg

2012 MTN–Qhubeka 

 Time Trial Championships, Reinardt Janse van Rensburg
 Road Race Championships, Lotto Petrus
 Time Trial Championships, Lotto Petrus
 Overall Tour du Maroc, Reinardt Janse van Rensburg
Stages 1, 5, 6 & 8, Reinardt Janse van Rensburg
Stages 3, 4, 9 & 10, Arran Brown
 Overall Tour de Bretagne, Reinardt Janse van Rensburg
Stage 4, Reinardt Janse van Rensburg
 Overall Ronde van Overijssel, Reinardt Janse van Rensburg
Prologue, Reinardt Janse van Rensburg
Circuit de Wallonie, Reinardt Janse van Rensburg
 Overall Tour of Eritrea, Jacques Janse van Rensburg
Stages 1 & 4, Jani Tewelde
Stage 2, Jacques Janse van Rensburg
Ronde van Zeeland Seaports, Reinardt Janse van Rensburg
Prologue & Stage 10 Volta a Portugal, Reinardt Janse van Rensburg

2013 MTN–Qhubeka 

 Road Race Championships, Jay Thomson
 Time Trial Championships, Ignatas Konovalovas
 U23 Road Race Championships, Louis Meintjes
 U23 Time Trial Championships, Louis Meintjes
Stage 2 Driedaagse van West-Vlaanderen, Gerald Ciolek
Milan – San Remo, Gerald Ciolek
Stage 5 Tour de Taiwan, Tsgabu Grmay
Stage 3 Bayern-Rundfahrt, Gerald Ciolek
Stage 1 Tour de Korea, Kristian Sbaragli
Stage 5 Tour de Korea, Team time trial
Stage 6 Tour of Austria, Gerald Ciolek
Stage 4 Volta a Portugal, Sergio Pardilla
Stage 2 Tour of Britain, Gerald Ciolek
Teams classification UCI Africa Tour
Stage 1 Tour of Rwanda, Jay Thomson
Stage 3 Tour of Rwanda, Louis Meintjes
Stage 4 Tour of Rwanda, Johann Van Zyl

2014 MTN–Qhubeka 

 Road Race Championships, Louis Meintjes
 U23 Road Race Championships, Louis Meintjes
 U23 Time Trial Championships, Louis Meintjes
Stage 4 La Tropicale Amissa Bongo, Ferekalsi Debesay
Stage 3 Vuelta a Andalucía, Gerald Ciolek
 Overall Mzansi Tour, Jacques Janse van Rensburg
Stage 1, Jacques Janse van Rensburg
Stage 2, Louis Meintjes
Stage 3 Tour d'Azerbaïdjan, Youcef Reguigui
Stage 4 Tour d'Azerbaïdjan, Linus Gerdemann
 Time Trial Championships, Tsgabu Grmay
 Road Race Championships, Tsgabu Grmay

2015 MTN–Qhubeka 

Trofeo Andratx-Mirador d'Es Colomer, Steve Cummings
 Road Race Championships, Jacques Janse van Rensburg
African Continental Championships (Road Race), Louis Meintjes
 Overall, Tour de Langkawi, Youcef Reguigui
Stage 7, Youcef Reguigui
 Overall, Settimana Internazionale di Coppi e Bartali, Louis Meintjes
Stage 4, Louis Meintjes
Stage 5 Tour des Fjords, Edvald Boasson Hagen
Stage 4 Ster ZLM Toer, Matt Brammeier
 Time Trial Championships, Edvald Boasson Hagen
 Time Trial Championships, Daniel Teklehaimanot
 Road Race Championships, Natnael Berhane
 Road Race Championships, Edvald Boasson Hagen
Stage 5 Tour of Austria, Johann van Zyl
Stage 14 Tour de France, Steve Cummings
Stage 2 Danmark Rundt, Edvald Boasson Hagen
Stage 10 Vuelta a España, Kristian Sbaragli
 Overall, Tour of Britain, Edvald Boasson Hagen
Stage 1 Tour de Chlef, Youcef Reguigui

2016 Team Dimension Data for Qhubeka 

 Overall Tour of Qatar, Mark Cavendish
Stage 1, Mark Cavendish
Stage 3, Edvald Boasson Hagen
 Road Race Championships, Jaco Venter
Stages 2 & 5 Tour of Oman, Edvald Boasson Hagen
  Overall Tour de Langkawi, Reinardt Janse van Rensburg
Stage 4 Tirreno–Adriatico, Steve Cummings
Stage 3 Tour of the Basque Country, Steve Cummings
Stage 2 Tour of Croatia, Mark Cavendish
Stages 4 & 5 Tour of Norway, Edvald Boasson Hagen
Stage 8 Tour of California, Mark Cavendish
Stage 4 Critérium du Dauphiné, Edvald Boasson Hagen
Stage 7 Critérium du Dauphiné, Steve Cummings
 Time Trial Championships, Kanstantsin Siutsou
 Time Trial Championships, Edvald Boasson Hagen
 Time Trial Championships, Daniel Teklehaimanot
 Time Trial Championships, Adrien Niyonshuti
 Road Race Championships, Daniel Teklehaimanot
 Road Race Championships, Kanstantsin Siutsou
 Road Race Championships, Edvald Boasson Hagen
Tour de France
Stages 1, 3, 6 & 14, Mark Cavendish
Stage 7, Steve Cummings
Stage 4 Vuelta a Burgos, Nathan Haas
 Mountains classification Vuelta a España, Omar Fraile
 Overall Tour of Britain, Steve Cummings
Stage 7 Eneco Tour, Edvald Boasson Hagen
Stages 2 & 4 Abu Dhabi Tour, Mark Cavendish

2017 Team Dimension Data for Qhubeka 

 Road Race Championships, Reinardt Janse van Rensburg
Stage 1 Abu Dhabi Tour, Mark Cavendish
 Overall Tour de Langkawi, Ryan Gibbons
Stage 4, Mekseb Debesay
Stage 5, Ryan Gibbons
 Overall Tour de Yorkshire, Serge Pauwels
Stage 3, Serge Pauwels
Stage 11 Giro d'Italia, Omar Fraile
 Overall Tour of Norway, Edvald Boasson Hagen
Stages 1 & 5, Edvald Boasson Hagen
 Overall Tour des Fjords, Edvald Boasson Hagen
Stages 3, 4, & 5, Edvald Boasson Hagen
 Time Trial Championships, Edvald Boasson Hagen
 Time Trial Championships, Steve Cummings
 Time Trial Championships, Mekseb Debesay
 Time Trial Championships, Adrien Niyonshuti
 Road Race Championships, Steve Cummings
Stage 5 Tour of Austria, Ben O'Connor
Stage 19 Tour de France, Edvald Boasson Hagen
 Road Race Championships, Youcef Reguigui

2018 Team Dimension Data for Qhubeka 

African Continental Championships (Time Trial), Mekseb Debesay
African Continental Championships (Road Race), Amanuel Gebrezgabihier
Stage 3 Dubai Tour, Mark Cavendish
Stage 3 Tour of the Alps, Ben O'Connor
Stage 2 Tour of Norway, Edvald Boasson Hagen
 Time Trial Championships, Edvald Boasson Hagen
 Road Race Championships, Merhawi Kudus
Stages 4 & 9 Vuelta a España, Ben King

2019 Team Dimension Data for Qhubeka 

Stage 1 (ITT) Volta a la Comunitat Valenciana, Edvald Boasson Hagen
Stage 6 Tour of Oman, Giacomo Nizzolo 
African Continental Championships, Time Trial, Stefan de Bod
Stage 3 Tour of Norway, Edvald Boasson Hagen
Stage 1 Critérium du Dauphiné, Edvald Boasson Hagen
Stage 5 Tour of Slovenia, Giacomo Nizzolo
 National Time Trial Championships, Amanuel Ghebreigzabhier
Stage 1 Vuelta a Burgos, Giacomo Nizzolo
 Time trial, African Games, Ryan Gibbons

2020 NTT Pro Cycling

Stage 5 Tour Down Under, Giacomo Nizzolo
Stage 4 Étoile de Bessèges, Ben O'Connor
Stages 3 & 8 Tour de Langkawi, Max Walscheid
 Road Race Championships, Ryan Gibbons
Stage 2 Paris–Nice, Giacomo Nizzolo
 Road Race Championships, Giacomo Nizzolo
 UEC European Road Championships, Giacomo Nizzolo
Stage 17 Giro d'Italia, Ben O'Connor

2021 Team Qhubeka Assos

Clásica de Almería, Giacomo Nizzolo
Stage 11 Giro d'Italia, Mauro Schmid
Stage 13 Giro d'Italia, Giacomo Nizzolo
Stage 15 Giro d'Italia, Victor Campenaerts
Circuito de Getxo, Giacomo Nizzolo

Supplementary statistics

DDD
wins